Gunnar Johannes Viken (born 9 July 1948 in Levanger) is a Norwegian dairy farmer and politician for the Conservative Party. Since 2007 he has been county mayor of Nord-Trøndelag County Municipality.

Viken has been a member of the Nord-Trøndelag County Council since 1999 and a deputy member of the Storting since 2013. Prior to his election as county mayor in 2007, he chaired the Conservative Party group in the county council for 4 years and the county agricultural board for 12 years. He entered politics as a member of the municipal council of Mosvik in the early 1980s. Viken did not seek his party's renomination to the county council in 2015.

Raised on a family farm in Mosvik, he passed the National Driving Teacher School and managed a driving school in Levanger from 1976 to 1982. Since 1982 he has been a dairy farmer and forester in Mosvik.

References

1948 births
Living people
Conservative Party (Norway) politicians
Politicians from Nord-Trøndelag
Chairmen of County Councils of Norway
People from Levanger
People from Mosvik
Norwegian farmers